In mathematics, the Griewank function is often used in testing of optimization. It is defined as follows:

 

The following paragraphs display the special cases of first, second and third order
Griewank function, and their  plots.

First-order Griewank function

 

The first order Griewank function has multiple maxima and minima.

Let the derivative of Griewank function be zero：

 

Find its roots in the interval [−100..100] by means of numerical method,

In the interval [−10000,10000], the Griewank function has 6365 critical points.

Second-order Griewank function

Third order Griewank function

References

Special functions